Theater Oobleck is a theater troupe in Chicago. It began in the 1980s in Ann Arbor, Michigan, as Streetlight Theater. Theater Oobleck was co-founded by Terri Kapsalis, Dave Buchen, Jeff Dorchen, Mickle Maher, and Greg Kotis. The name "Oobleck" came from the 1949 Dr. Seuss book Bartholomew and the Oobleck. The troupe moved to Chicago in 1988, where it has continued to produce original scripts. Notably, Theater Oobleck works without a director.

Oobleck plays often feature famous historical or contemporary characters, juxtaposition, playful language, humor, and political thought. Two plays written and produced by Theater Oobleck have been published. Previous plays performed by Theater Oobleck include The Strangerer, Strauss at Midnight, and Hunchback Variations.

References

External links
 

Theatre companies in Michigan
Theatre companies in Chicago
Culture of Ann Arbor, Michigan